The Acer Aspire 8920 is a series of notebooks released in 2008 Q1 by Acer Inc. and it was a part of the Gemstone series. It is the first 18.4" screen notebook created by Acer, and it is part of the Desktop replacement computer category. The laptop has a 16:9 display with a native resolution of 1920 x 1080. It was often described as the flagship of Acer Aspire models until it was surpassed by other 8900s series Desktop replacement computer laptop, such as the Acer Aspire 8930G, 8940 and 8942.

Dimensions

Note: Weight varies by configuration

References

Acer Inc. laptops